Central High School is located in the town of Woodstock, Virginia and is part of the Shenandoah County Public Schools. It was built in 1959. It serves 796 students in grades 9-12. In 2006, Central High School had 14 students for every full-time equivalent teacher (the Virginia state average is 12). The principal as of 2019 is Lori Swortzel.

Central High School's colors are royal blue and  old gold and their mascot is the falcon. Central High School and the other two Shenandoah County high schools desegregated in 1963. In 2015, CHS was designated a National Blue Ribbon School.

References

Public high schools in Virginia
Schools in Shenandoah County, Virginia